Rafael Pardo Rueda (born 26 November 1953) is a Colombian politician. A Liberal party politician and economist, he has previously served as the 1st Minister of Labour of Colombia serving in the Administration of President Juan Manuel Santos Calderón, Minister of National Defence, and was elected Senator of Colombia for the 2002-2006 legislative period.

Career
A 1994-1995 Fellow at the Weatherhead Centre for International Affairs of Harvard Faculty of Arts and Sciences in Cambridge, Massachusetts.

He was the candidate of the Liberal Party for the 2010 Presidential Election.

On 31 October 2011, President Juan Manuel Santos Calderón announced the designation of Pardo as the head of the newly created Ministry of Labour, established as part of a wider Ministerial Cabinet Reform in order to fulfil some of his 2010 campaign promises.

In March 2014, President Santos appointed Minister Pardo as acting Mayor of Bogotá, a position he held until April of that year. Pardo is also a member of Washington D.C. based think tank The Inter-American Dialogue.

Works
Books

Other

References

1953 births
People from Bogotá
University of Los Andes (Colombia) alumni
Colombian economists
Colombian Liberal Party politicians
Colombian Ministers of Defense
Members of the Senate of Colombia
Colombian Ministers of Labour
Mayors of Bogotá
Living people
Members of the Inter-American Dialogue